Qatar Television,; abbreviated as Qatar TV or QTV), is a Qatar Government owned public service national television channel in Qatar which is owned and run by Qatar General Broadcasting and Television Corporation. The channel broadcasts various programmes including news, economical bulletins, documentaries, religious programmes and entertainment.

Launched in August 1970, QTV was the first television network to produce and transmit its own programmes in the country. Programmes were aired every day for three to four hours with a 50 kW transmitter. In 1974, it began transmitting color broadcasts. It had a monopoly on television audience until 1993, when Qatar Cablevision began broadcasting satellite channels. Despite the broadening of television offerings, Qatar TV remains popular amongst locals.

References

External links
Official Website 

Television networks in Qatar
Internet television channels
Arabic-language television stations
State media
Television channels and stations established in 1970
1970 establishments in Qatar